The Fujifilm FinePix T-series is a range of compact digital cameras comprising models featuring a wide zoom range. All the models in the T-series feature a 10x optical zoom lens, and with digital zoom its zooming level becomes 67x, which offers the 35 mm equivalent focal length of a 28-280mm zoom FUJINON LENS. Additional functions include Scene Recognition Auto and high-definition video. It supports SDHC memory cards.

Models
2011+2012 models
FinePix T200
FinePix T300
FinePix T350
FinePix T400

See also 
 Fujifilm FinePix
 Fujifilm FinePix T-series
 Fujifilm cameras
 Fujifilm
 Olympus VR-310
 Pentax Optio

References

T-series